This is a list of fellows of the Royal Society elected in 1789.

Fellows
 James Adair (c.1743–1798), Irish Sergeant-at-Law
 Abraham Bennet (1749–1799), clergyman and physicist
 Claude Louis, Count Berthollet (1748–1822), French chemist
 Johann Elert Bode (1747–1826), German astronomer
 Jean Dominique Cassini, Count of Thury (1748–1845), French astronomer
 Jonathan Davies (1736–1809), Eton headmaster
 Sampson Eardley, Baron Eardley (died 1824)
 Richard Fitzwilliam, 7th Viscount Fitzwilliam of Meryon (1745–1816)
 Frederick Augustus, Duke of York and Albany (1763–1827), Royal Member
 Adrien Marie Le Gendre (1752–1833), French mathematician
 John Gillies (1747–1836), historian
 Samuel Goodenough, Bishop of Carlisle (1743–1827)
 Henry Frederick William, Duke of Cumberland and Strathearn (1745–1790), Royal Member
 Ewald Friedrich Herzberg (1725–1795), Prussian statesman
 Christian Gottlob Heyne (1729–1812), German archaeologist
 Edward Jenner (1749–1823), physician
 Abraham Gotthelf Kastner (1719–1800), German mathematician
 Pierre Simon Laplace (1749–1827), French scholar
 Pierre François Andre Méchain (1744–1805), French astronomer
 John David Michaelis (1717–1791), Prussian scholar
 Robert Morse (1743–1818), military engineer
 George Rogers (died 1816), Navy commissioner
 George Shaw (1751–1813), botanist and zoologist
 Johann Karl Wilcke (1732–1796), Swedish physicist
 Robert Wood, MP

References

1789
1789 in science
1789 in England